Artesian may refer to:

 Someone from the County of Artois
 Artesian aquifer, a source of water
 Artesian Builds, a former computer building company
 Artesian, South Dakota, United States
 Great Artesian Basin, Australia
 The Artesian Hotel, a casino and spa in Sulphur, Oklahoma
 296819 Artesian, an asteroid